Kyle Eastwood (born May 19, 1968) is an American jazz bassist and film composer. He studied film at the University of Southern California for two years before embarking on a music career. After becoming a session player in the early 1990s and leading his own quartet, he released his first solo album, From There to Here, in 1998. His album The View From Here was released in 2013 by Jazz Village. In addition to his solo albums, Eastwood has composed music for nine of his father's, Clint Eastwood, films. Eastwood plays fretted and fretless electric bass guitar and double bass.

Early life 
Kyle Clinton Eastwood was born May 19, 1968, the son of Margaret Neville Eastwood (nee Johnson) (born 1931) and actor-director Clint Eastwood. He has a sister, Alison, who was born in 1972. He also has six known paternal half-siblings: Laurie (b. 1954), Kimber (b. 1964), Scott (b. 1986), Kathryn (b. 1988), Francesca (b. 1993) and Morgan (b. 1996).

Career

Music 

Eastwood comes from a musical family, as noted in an October 27, 2006, article from The Independent newspaper:

Music was prominent in the Eastwood home. According to his biography with Hopper Management, Eastwood grew up listening to records by jazz legends such as Miles Davis, Dave Brubeck, Thelonious Monk, and the Stan Kenton Big Band with his parents, who were both jazz lovers. Eastwood attended the Monterey Jazz Festival numerous times with his parents. "One advantage of having a famous father was I got to go backstage," Eastwood explained in an interview conducted by stepmother Dina Ruiz Eastwood. "I met a lot of artists, greats like Dizzy Gillespie and Sarah Vaughan. Looking back on that, I can see how much the musicians I met there influenced my career."

Eastwood began playing bass guitar in high school, learning R&B, Motown, and reggae tunes by ear. After studying with French bassist Bunny Brunel, he began playing gigs in New York City and Los Angeles, forming the Kyle Eastwood Quartet which contributed to Eastwood After Hours: Live at Carnegie Hall (1996), a concert in honor of Clint Eastwood and his dedication to jazz. Clint Eastwood has always been supportive of, and interested in, Kyle's work, as Eastwood told The Independent: "As far as my father is concerned, as long as I was serious about my music career, he was supportive of me."

Two years later, in 1998, Sony released his first album, From There to Here, a collection of jazz standards and original compositions. After signing with the UK's Candid Records in 2004, Eastwood moved to Dave Koz's label, Rendezvous, which released his albums Paris Blue (2005), and Now (2006).

In addition to his solo albums, Eastwood has also contributed music to nine of his father's films: The Rookie (1990), Mystic River (2002), Million Dollar Baby (2004), Flags of Our Fathers (2006), Letters from Iwo Jima (2006), Changeling (2008), Gran Torino (2008), Invictus (2009) and J. Edgar (2011). He was nominated with music partner Michael Stevens for a 2006 Chicago Film Critics Association Award for Original Score (Letters from Iwo Jima).

In 2014 Eastwood and Matt McGuire contributed to the score of the documentary Homme Less about homeless photographer Mark Reay.

Other work 
Kyle Eastwood provided the voice of "Daddy" in "Daddy and Son" (2007) and the voice of 1980s-era DJ Andy Wright for the computer game The Movies (2005).

He had a supporting role in the 1982 Clint Eastwood film Honkytonk Man.

Personal life 
Eastwood has a daughter, Graylen (b. March 28, 1994; age 28) with Laura Gomez. They married in May 1995 and filed for divorce in 2005.

Eastwood married Cynthia Ramirez in September 2014 at his father's Mission Ranch Hotel in Carmel, California.

Discography

Studio albums

Compilation albums

Soundtracks

Filmography

Composer/performer/arranger 
 1990 The Rookie as composer, "Red Zone" with Michael Stevens
 1991 Regarding Henry as uncredited performer
 2003 Mystic River as composer, "Cosmo", "Black Emerald Blues" with Michael Stevens
 2004 Million Dollar Baby as composer, "Boxing Baby", "Solferino", "Blue Diner" with Michael Stevens
 2006 Letters from Iwo Jima as composer, with Michael Stevens
 2006 Flags of Our Fathers as arranger
 2007 Rails & Ties as music by
 2008 Changeling as arrangements
 2008 Gran Torino as composer, with Michael Stevens
 2009 Invictus as composer, with Michael Stevens
 2011 J. Edgar as composer, "Red Sails in the Sunset", "I Only Have Eyes for You"

Actor 
 1976 The Outlaw Josey Wales as Josey's Son (uncredited)
 1980 Bronco Billy as Orphan (uncredited)
 1982 Honkytonk Man as Whit Stovall
 1990 The Rookie as Band Member At Ackerman's House Party (uncredited)
 1995 The Bridges of Madison County as James Rivers Band
 2007 Summer Hours as James
 2011 J. Edgar  as Member of The "Stork Club Band"

References

External links 
 
 
 Profile at All About Jazz
 [ Kyle Eastwood] at Allmusic

1968 births
Living people
Guitarists from Los Angeles
People from Carmel-by-the-Sea, California
Clint Eastwood
Eastwood family
American jazz bass guitarists
American male bass guitarists
American jazz double-bassists
American male jazz musicians
American film score composers
American male film score composers
Male double-bassists
Jazz musicians from California
Smooth jazz bass guitarists
Mack Avenue Records artists
20th-century American male actors
21st-century American male actors
20th-century American bass guitarists
21st-century American bass guitarists
20th-century American male musicians
21st-century American male musicians
21st-century double-bassists